"Shadows of Love" is a song by new wave duo Wax, released by RCA in 1986 as the third single from their debut studio album Magnetic Heaven. The song was written by band members Andrew Gold and Graham Gouldman, and produced by Phil Thornalley.

Music videos
Two music videos were made for the single. The video for the UK and European market was directed by John Scarlett-Davis for the production company Aldabra. It features Wax performing the song in a "pop-up book" setting. The video for the North American market, which revolves around a young pair who meet in a bar, was directed by Storm Thorgerson and produced by Antony Taylor for PMI.

Critical reception
Upon its release as a single, William Leith of NME described "Shadows of Love" as "not a bad start" for Wax. He noted that the "combination of swelling and pounding keyboard-patterns is workable, if a little childlike" and also added that the song is "a little chock with obvious rhymes". Adrian Bishop of The Western Gazette noted that the song is "built round the bass and synth, which make an effective combination, but it tails away into a poor MOR melody". He added that it "never reaches the heights of such solid Gold tracks as 'Lonely Boy' and 'Never Let Her Slip Away' or any of Gouldman's 10cc classics". Music & Media picked it as one of their "sure hits" in their issue of 5 July 1986 and added that it is a "remarkable" song from their "splendid [debut] album". In the US, Billboard described it as a "disco-pop tune elevated on one of the artier walls of sound".

Track listing
7–inch single (UK, Europe, Australia and Japan)
"Shadows of Love" – 4:29
"Magnetic Heaven" – 3:30

7–inch promotional single (UK and Europe)
"Shadows of Love" (DJ version) – 4:14
"Magnetic Heaven" – 3:30

7–inch single (US and Canada)
"Shadows of Love" – 4:39
"Magnetic Heaven" – 3:30

7–inch promotional single (US and Canada)
"Shadows of Love" – 4:39
"Shadows of Love" – 4:39

12–inch single (UK and Europe)
"Shadows of Love" – 4:39
"Magnetic Heaven" – 3:30
"People All Over This World" – 3:40

Personnel
Credits are adapted from the Magnetic Heaven vinyl LP liner notes and the 12-single vinyl single.

Wax
 Andrew Gold – vocals, backing vocals, keyboards, guitar, drums and programming
 Graham Gouldman – bass guitar, backing vocals

Production
 Phil Thornalley – producer and engineer ("Shadows of Love", "Magnetic Heaven")
 Andrew Gold, Graham Gouldman – producers ("People All Over This World")

Other
 Simon Fowler – photography
 Jason Bratby – front cover painting
 The Leisure Process – design, art direction

Charts

Cover versions
In 1987, American singer Nicolette Larson recorded the song and used its title for the name of her seventh studio album, which was released in Italy only by CGD in 1988.

References

1986 songs
1986 singles
Wax (British band) songs
Songs written by Graham Gouldman
Songs written by Andrew Gold
Song recordings produced by Phil Thornalley
RCA Records singles